GSLI can refer to:
Gloria Steinem Leadership Institute (GSLI), a training program of Choice USA, a pro-choice organization.
Grammatical specific language impairment (G-SLI), a language disability, a form of Specific language impairment.